Brian Leary (born 24 May 1930) is a former  Australian rules footballer who played with Hawthorn in the Victorian Football League (VFL). He played his first game in 1950 at the age of 20 years and 17 days, and his second and last game at 20 years and 24 days.

Notes

External links 

Living people
1930 births
Australian rules footballers from Victoria (Australia)
Hawthorn Football Club players